Anil Kumar Singh may refer to:
Anil Kumar Singh (chemist)
Anil Kumar Singh (politician)
Anil Singh (javelin thrower)

See also
 Anil Singh (disambiguation)